The South Belridge Oil Field is a large oil field in northwestern Kern County, San Joaquin Valley, California, about forty miles west of Bakersfield. The principal operator on the field was Aera Energy LLC, a joint venture between Royal Dutch Shell and ExxonMobil. Additionally, the field included the only onshore wells in California owned and operated by ExxonMobil.

Setting
The oil field is located along State Route 33, between the junctions with State Route 58 on the south and State Route 46 on the north. The field is in an area of gentle slope to the southwest, just above the San Joaquin Valley which is adjacent on the east; the crest of the Temblor Range, the nearest part of the California Coast Ranges, parallels the oil field about ten miles to the southwest.

The South Belridge Oil Field is part of the larger Belridge Producing Complex of Aera Energy LLC, which includes also the smaller, but still substantial oil fields of North Belridge, Lost Hills, and Cymric, all in northwestern Kern County.

Most native vegetation is gone from the oil field, with the most dense operational areas being almost completely barren except for pumping units, drilling pads, evaporation ponds, storage tanks, steam generators, and associated equipment.  In spite of this seeming sterility, species such as the endangered San Joaquin kit fox (vulpes macrotis mutica) continue to use areas of oil field development as habitat.

Geology
The South Belridge Field is a southeast-plunging anticline, in which the oil has collected in pools in structural traps sealed by both above-lying impermeable units as well as  tar seals.  Most of the oil has pooled in the Tulare Formation, of Pleistocene age, and in the Diatomite Formation, of Pliocene−Miocene age.  The oil itself probably originated in the underlying Monterey Formation, migrating upward to structural and stratigraphic traps over time.

Extraction
A total of six oil pools have been found in the South Belridge:  the Tulare, Etchegoin, Diatomite, Antelope Shale, McDonald, and Devilwater-Gould. Both the Tulare and Diatomite were discovered in 1911, and these are both the largest and nearest the surface, with average depths of  respectively. The Devilwater-Gould, found in 1980 at a depth of  feet, only produced from one well for nine months, and was abandoned.

Only two of the pools contained significant enough reserves to be subject to enhanced recovery projects: the Tulare and Diatomite, both of which have been steamflooded, waterflooded, and fireflooded.  Operators began steamflooding the Tulare Formation in 1963 in order to increase production rates; as of 1997, this was the only enhanced recovery technology still in use there.  Oil from the Tulare Formation is heavy crude, with a specific gravity of 10–13 API, and a low sulfur content of 0.23%, while oil from the Diatomite is classified as medium crude, with an API index of 25–30.

Operations
Belridge Oil Company discovered the field. It retained control of operations until 1979 when Shell Oil purchased the company along with most of the production rights on the South Belridge Field for $3.65 billion. Currently Aera Energy LLC is the main operator on the field.

As of the end of 2006 Aera Energy was the second-largest producer of oil in California, after Chevron Corp.

Solar EOR Project 
In November 2017, GlassPoint and Aera Energy announced a joint project to add a solar EOR field to the South Belridge Oil Field. This new facility is projected to produce approximately 12 million barrels of steam per year through a 850MW thermal solar steam generator. It is also projected to cut carbon emissions from the oil field by 376,000 metric tons per year.

References
 California Oil and Gas Fields, Volumes I, II and III.  Vol. I (1998), Vol. II (1992), Vol. III (1982).  California Department of Conservation, Division of Oil, Gas, and Geothermal Resources (DOGGR).  1,472 pp.  South Belridge field information is on pp. 36–38. PDF file available on CD from www.consrv.ca.gov.
 California Department of Conservation, Oil and Gas Statistics, Annual Report, December 31, 2006.

Notes

External links
100 Years of Oil, from the Bakersfield Californian:  stories about local oilfields including the South Belridge
Approximate center of the field, in Google Maps

Natural gas fields in the United States
Oil fields in Kern County, California
Geography of the San Joaquin Valley
Oil fields in California